The 2009 Miami Valley Silverbacks season was the fourth season for the Continental Indoor Football League (CIFL) franchise. The Silverbacks planned on sitting out the 2009 CIFL season, but due to the West Virginia Wild getting suspended from the league, the CIFL offered for the Silverbacks to take the place of the Wild. They had been scheduled to play a 12-game season, primarily as a traveling team, only playing two home games at Hobart Arena, but two of their road games were cancelled. The team hired Derrick Shepard, a former NFL and Arena Football League defensive tackle, to coach the team. On April 14, the Silverbacks announced that a majority of their remaining 2009 season games were to be broadcast live online for free on MCP-TV at www.miamicountypost.com. Professional sports announcer JT Szabo provided the play-by-play. The team finished with a franchise-worst record of 0–10, failing to make the playoffs for the third straight season.

Schedule

2009 standings

References

2009 Continental Indoor Football League season
Dayton Sharks
Miami Valley Silverbacks